Japanese football in 1939.

Emperor's Cup

Births
March 13 - Yoshinobu Ishii
July 16 - Ryozo Suzuki
September 12 - Nobuyuki Oishi

External links

 
Seasons in Japanese football